Laelida is a genus of longhorn beetles of the subfamily Lamiinae, containing the following species:

 Laelida alboochracea Hüdepohl, 1998
 Laelida antennata Pascoe, 1866

References

Lamiini